The sieges of Riga were two sieges which took place on February 22 and June 15, 1700, in Riga during the Great Northern War. The Swedish garrison of about 4,000 men under the command of Erik Dahlberg successfully repulsed the Saxons until the main Swedish army under Charles XII of Sweden arrived to sweep the Saxons away in the battle of Riga which ended the period of sieges for the year. 

The successful attempt to take the city from Sweden was made in the siege of Riga (1710) by the Russians under Peter the Great.

References

Anders Fryxell: Lebensgeschichte Karl's des Zwölften, Königs von Schweden. Band 1, Zweiter Abschnitt, 16. Kapitel, Friedrich Vieweg und Sohn, Braunschweig 1861.
Hochspringen ↑ Heinz von Zur Mühlen: Baltisches historisches Ortslexikon, Band 2, Köln 1990, S. 132.
Hochspringen ↑ Knut Lundblad, Georg Friedrich Jenssen-Tusch: Geschichte Karl des Zwölften, Königs von Schweden, Band 1, Hamburg 1835, S. 41–55.
Olle Larsson, Stormaktens sista krig (2009) Lund, Historiska Media. Sida 86. 

Riga
1700 in Europe
Conflicts in 1700
Riga (1700)
History of Riga
Swedish Livonia
Riga (1700)